Firekind was a comics strip published in the British weekly anthology comic 2000 AD for 13 issues in 1993. It was written by John Smith, with art by Paul Marshall.

Publication history
Firekind came about as part of the "Spring Fever" promotion at 2000 AD after a change in distribution saw a big drop-off in sales. The assistant editor Alan McKenzie had contacted John Smith and suggested he might want to write a story involving dragons to make up for the lack of fantasy in the comic. According to Smith:

The story was originally serialised in 2000 AD from issues #828 to #840. Part 7, however, which should have appeared in issue #834, was accidentally omitted. According to John Tomlinson, another assistant editor:

Paul Marshall spotted the error but the production staff were running sufficiently far-ahead that they were putting together issue #839 and the missing episode had to be run after the final installment.

The story was entirely reprinted in its proper order in 2000 AD Extreme Edition #8 (2005) and 2000 AD: The Ultimate Collection #82 (2020).

Plot synopsis
The self-contained story concerns a human xeno-botanist named Larsen who travels to the alien jungle planet Gennyo-Leil whose atmosphere is a toxic hallucinogen. Though he initially gains the inhabitants' trust, his mission is compromised by the arrival of a merciless gang of mercenary poacher / torturers. But Gennyo-Leil is not without defences...

James Cameron's film Avatar, released sixteen years later, has a number of similarities with Firekind.

Notes

References

Firekind at Barney
Bishop, David Thrill-Power Overload (Rebellion Developments, 260 pages, hardcover, February 2007)

Comics by John Smith (comics writer)
Dragons in popular culture